Texas Hippie Coalition (sometimes stylized THC) is an American heavy metal band from Denison, Texas.

History 
The band was formed in Denison, Texas by Big Dad Ritch, along with his friend John Exall and other friends. Several lineup changes occurred before, Rollin, with producer Dave Prater. Rollin arrived on July 6, 2010, which was their first national release.

In early 2012 the group began working with producer Bob Marlette. Their first single "Turn It Up" was released in June of that same year. Peacemaker was released on August 14, 2012, and was ranked 20 on Billboard Hard Rock Albums.

In February 2014, it was announced that Ride On, the fourth studio album from the quartet is expected to be released October 7, 2014. The record was produced by Skidd Mills, known for working with Saving Abel, Sick Puppies and others, at Sound Kitchen Studios. "Ride On" has been described by the band as, "the next level," "a little more raw, a little grittier," and "our way of letting everybody know that rock 'n' roll ain't dead."

During that same year, the ensemble also performed at Rocklahoma and Rock on the Range in May in addition to Mayhem Festival in the summer of 2014.

On February 23, 2016, the ensemble announced that their fifth studio album, Dark Side of Black, would be released on April 22, 2016. In April and May 2016, the band is scheduled to tour in support of this work, which includes performances at Rock on the Range, Rocklahoma and River City Rockfest.

In June 2016, the band announced the addition of guitarist Nevada Romo.

In August 2017, Ritch announced that the ensemble plans to release their sixth studio album in 2018. On January 12, 2018, Exall announced that he and the band had parted ways, leaving Ritch as the sole original band member.  In early 2018, Larado Romo, brother of guitarist Nevada Romo, joined the ensemble on bass guitar.

During the first week of 2019, percussionist Timmy Braun and the band parted ways.  Braun was replaced by Devon Carothers.

On March 29, 2019, "Moonshine", the first single from High in the Saddle, the sixth studio album from the group, was released.  At that time, the ensemble announced that the work would be released on May 31, 2019, the first from the band released through Entertainment One.

In 2020, Scott Lytle, former percussionist for the band from 2007 to 2008, died.

On January 10, 2021, the band mutually parted ways with drummer Devon Carothers. On January 12, Locust Grove and DEITY drummer Joey Mandigo was announced as the band's new drummer.

Personnel 

Current members
 Big Dad Ritch – lead vocals (2004-present)
 Cord Pool – guitar (2014-present)
 Nevada Romo – guitar, backing vocals (2016-present)
 Larado Romo – bass, backing vocals (2018-present)
 Joey Mandigo – drums (2021-present)

Former members
 Randy Cooper – guitar (2007–2012)
 Ryan "The Kid" Bennett – drums (2009–2011)
 Alden "Crawfish" Nequent – guitar (2009–2011)
 Michael Hayes – guitar (2004–2008)
 Scott "Cowboy" Lytle – drums (2007–2008)
 Dillon Escue – drums (2008)
 Cody Perryman – guitar (2004–2007)
 Wes Wallace – guitar (2013–2014)
 Carl Lowe – drums
 Gunnar Molton – drums
 Lance Bruton – drums
 Jason Elmore – guitar (2007)
 John Exall – bass (2004–2018)
 Timmy Braun – drums (2011–2019)
 Devon Carothers – drums (2019–2021)

Timeline

Discography

Studio albums

Singles

Music videos

Other information 
 In July 2015, bassist John Exall started a new musical ensemble called Smoke Hollow along with three musicians, Diego "Ashes" Ibarra from Static-X, Dewey Bragg from Kill Devil Hill and Ralf Mueggler from Crowned by Fire.

References

External links 

Musical groups established in 2004
Heavy metal musical groups from Texas
Rock music groups from Texas